Longyou County is a county of Quzhou City, in the west of Zhejiang Province, China.

In it is located the Huzhen pagoda. The Quzhou Longyou Caves or Grottoes.  are a local feature.

Administrative divisions
Subdistricts:
Donghua Subdistrict (东华街道), Longzhou Subdistrict (龙洲街道)

Towns:
Huzhen (湖镇镇), Xikou (溪口镇), Hengshan (横山镇), Tashi (塔石镇), Zhanjia (詹家镇), Xiaonanhai (小南海镇)

Townships:
Miaoxia Township (庙下乡), Shifo Township (石佛乡), Mohuan Township (模环乡), Luojia Township (罗家乡), Sheyang Township (社阳乡), Dajie Township (大街乡), Shujian She Ethnic Township (沐尘畲族乡)

Climate

References

County-level divisions of Zhejiang
Quzhou